The National Film Award for Best Feature Film in Malayalam is one of the National Film Awards presented annually by the Directorate of Film Festivals, the organisation set up by Ministry of Information and Broadcasting, India. It is one of several awards presented for feature films and awarded with Rajat Kamal (Silver Lotus).

The National Film Awards, established in 1954, are the most prominent film awards in India that merit the best of the Indian cinema. The ceremony also presents awards for films in various regional languages.

Awards for films in seven regional language (Bengali, Hindi, Kannada, Malayalam, Marathi, Tamil and Telugu) started from 2nd National Film Awards which were presented on 21 December 1955. Three awards of "President's Silver Medal for Best Feature Film", "Certificate of Merit for the Second Best Feature Film" and "Certificate of Merit for the Third Best Feature Film" were instituted. The later two certificate awards were discontinued from 15th National Film Awards (1967).

The first winner of the "President's Silver Medal for Best Feature Film in Malayalam" was the 1954 film Neelakuyil. Jointly directed by P. Bhaskaran and Ramu Kariat, the film was based on a story written by Malayalam writer Uroob. It told the story of a love affair between a Dalit girl and an educated, high caste school teacher. The film is considered landmark in Malayalam cinema history. Along with Neelakuyil, S. S. Rajan directed film Sneha Seema was honoured with a Certificate of Merit. Following is the list of Silver Lotus Award (Rajat Kamal) recipient films produced in Malayalam language.

Winners 

Award includes 'Rajat Kamal' (Silver Lotus Award) and cash prize. Following are the award winners over the years:

References

External links 
 Official Page for Directorate of Film Festivals, India
 National Film Awards Archives

Malayalam
Malayalam cinema